Darreh Asali (also Romanized as Darreh ‘Asalī; also known as ‘Asalū and Darreh ‘Asalū) is a village in Tasuj Rural District, in the Central District of Kavar County, Fars Province, Iran. At the 2006 census, its population was 441, in 96 families.

References 

Populated places in Kavar County